"Burning" is a eurodance song written by Joakim Udd, Karl Euren and Johan Fjellström performed for Alcazar's third studio album, Disco Defenders and released as the fourth single from the album.

Music video
The video for the song was shot in Stockholm in March, 2009 and released on April 16, 2009.

Formats and track listings
These are the formats and track listings of promotional single releases of "Burning".

CD Single
"Burning" (Radio Edit) - 3:09
"Burning" (Moveelectric Remix) - 6:49
"Burning" (Christian Hornbostel & Alfred Azzetto Alternative Dub Mix) - 7:03

Almighty Remixes Promo
"Burning" (Almighty Essential Radio Edit) - 3:53
"Burning" (Almighty 12 inch Essential Mix) - 7:46
"Burning" (Almighty 12 inch Essential Dub) - 7:14
"Burning" (Almighty 12 inch Essential Instrumental) - 7:44

Promotional CD single
"Burning" - 3:09

Chart performance
Even though Burning has not been released in Europe yet, it is a hit choice from DJs and a Club hit. For these reasons, it has charted at number 4 on Germany's DJ Top 100 list since now.

Release history

References

External links
Alcazar Official Website

Alcazar (band) songs
2009 singles
Universal Music Group singles
2009 songs